Bokul Kotha  is an Indian Bengali television soap opera that aired from 4 December 2017 to 1 February 2022 on Zee Bangla. The show was produced by Acropoliis Entertainment Pvt. Ltd. and starred Ushasi Ray and Honey Bafna in lead roles and Uponita Bnaerjee, Sumanta Mukherjee, Shreyasree Samanta, Suvajit Kar, Arindam Banerjee and Biplab Banerjee in supporting roles.

The show is a remake of the Odia serial "Sindura Bindu" that aired on Zee Sarthak, and has been well received by the audience. In June 2018, the show had a TRP of 11.2. The show marks the return of Ushasi Ray in a lead role on Bengali television since her portrayal of 'Ahona' in the Star Jalsha drama series Milon Tithi, also produced by Acropoliis Entertainment. Bokul Kotha is a Bengali television series starring Ushasi Ray and Honey Bafna in the lead. This is a story of Bokul, a tomboyish girl, who looks after all the responsibilities of a head of the family. After much drama and confusion, she marries Rishi, who has already rejected 40 women for marriage.

Premise
The storyline revolves around a girl named Bokul, living in Barasat, West Bengal, who is tomboyish in nature but a brave, honest and free-spirited soul. Under unforeseen circumstances, she marries Rishi. Initially, Rishi does not accept Bokul as his wife due to her appearance and mannerisms, but after getting to know her closely they develop a strong bond with each other, which develops into a unique relationship with their friendship being the base. Bokul too carves a special place for herself in the hearts of Rishi's family members with her loving and caring nature. Rishi also stands by Bokul in her fight against her late father's culprits and supports her to reprise her studies and become an IPS officer.

Cast

Main cast 
 Ushasi Ray as Bokul Sanyal Roy – IPS Officer; Lajbonti and Animesh's younger daughter; Barsha's sister; Rishi's wife. (2017-2020) 
Honey Bafna as Rishi Roy – A rich and successful businessman; Anjali and Shekhar's younger son; Rohan and Roshni's brother; Bokul's husband. (2017-2020)

Recurring cast 
 Upanita Banerjee as Barsha Sanyal Basu – Lajbonti and Animesh's elder daughter; Bokul's sister; Kunal's wife. (2017-2020) 
 Suvajit Kar as Kunal Basu – A spoiled opportunist; Rohan, Rishi and Roshni's cousin; Barsha's husband. (2017-2020) 
 Sohini Sanyal as Lajbonti Sanyal – Animesh's widow; Barsha and Bokul's mother. (2017-2019)
 Rajib Banerjee as Animesh Sanyal - Barsha and Bokul's late father.
 Anuradha Roy as Gaayatri Sanyal – Animesh's mother; Barsha and Bokul's grandmother.(2017-2019) 
 Mayukh Chatterjee as Goblu – Bokul's friend.(2017-2018) 
 Sumanta Mukherjee as Shekhar Roy – A businessman; Samar's brother; Anjali's husband; Rohan, Roshni and Rishi's father; Mishti and Dabbu's grandfather. (2017-2019) 
 Saswati Guha Thakurata as Anjali Roy – A school teacher; Pritha's sister; Shekhar's wife; Rohan, Roshni and Rishi's mother; Mishti and Dabbu's grandmother. (2017-2020) 
 Pritha Chatterjee as Pritha – Anjali's sister.(2018-2019) 
 Arindam Banerjee as Samar Roy – A corrupt businessman; Shekhar's brother; Ragini's husband; Esha's father; Animesh's murderer.(2017-2020) 
 Mallika Majumdar as Ragini Roy – Samar's wife; Esha's mother.(2017-2020) 
 Subhrajit Dutta as Rohan Roy – Anjali and Shekhar's elder son; Roshni and Rishi's brother; Aditi's husband; Mishti's father. (2017-2020) 
 Arpita Mukherjee as Aditi Roy – Rohan's wife; Mishti's mother.
 Shriti Singh as Mishti Roy – Rohan and Aditi's daughter.
 Shreyasee Samanta as Roshni Roy Banerjee – Anjali and Shekhar's daughter; Rohan and Rishi's sister; Saurabh's wife; Dabbu's mother.
 Sutirtha Saha / Rajkumar Dutta as Saurabh Banerjee – Roshni's husband; Dabbu's father.
 Deerghoi Paul as Puja Banerjee – Saurabh's sister.
 Aishik Mukherjee as Dabbu Banerjee – Roshni and Saurabh's son.
 Amrita Debnath as Esha Roy Chatterjee – Samar and Ragini's daughter; Bokul's sister-in-law and friend; Deep's wife.
 Arnab Chowdhury as Deep Chatterjee – Rishi's friend and co-worker; Esha's husband.
 Uma Bardhan as Shikha – Kunal's aunt; Rocky's mother.
 Raj Bhattacharya as Rocky – Shikha's son; Kunal's cousin.
 Biplab Banerjee as Rajatava Rakshit – A corrupt minister; Animesh's murderer.
 Namita Chakraborty as Bani Rakshit – Rajatabha's wife; Tina and Arunabha's mother.
 Priyanka Halder as Tina Rakshit – An arrogant brat; Rajatabha and Bani's daughter; Arunabha's sister.
 Neil Chatterjee as Arunabha Rakshit – An arrogant brat; Rajatabha and Bani's son; Tina's brother; Esha's fiancé; Bokul's enemy. He was encountered by Bokul. 
 Gopa Nandi as Tumpa – Lajbonti's neighbour; Bokul's well-wisher.
 Biresh Chakraborty as Inspector Agnijit Roy.
 Ananya Sengupta as Ranita Singha – IG of police; Bokul's boss.
 Gora Dhar as Binod Pradhan
 Debraj Mukherjee as Musa Bhai

Cameo
 Ankita Bhattacharya as herself
Sourav Ganguly as Dada
Tiyasha Roy as Shyama Chowdhury (Cameo from Krishnakoli)
Neel Bhattacharya as Nikhil Chowdhury (Cameo from Krishnakoli)
 Snighdhajit Bhowmik 
 Krushal Ahuja as Dhrubo Mitra (Cameo from Ranu Pelo Lottery) 
 Gaurav Sarkar
 Bijoylakshmi Chatterjee as Ranu Mitra (Cameo from Ranu Pelo Lottery)
 Gaurab Roy Chowdhury
 Suman Dey as Jashojeet Bose aka Jash (Cameo from Nakshi Kantha)
Manali Dey as Shabnam (Cameo from Nakshi Kantha)

References

External links
 Bokul Kotha at ZEE5

2017 Indian television series debuts
2020 Indian television series endings
Zee Bangla original programming